The Castle of Cocentaina, located in the municipality of Cocentaina, Alicante, Spain, is a 14th-century medieval building which stands on a rocky mound of 765 m. The castle structure, recently restored, is one of the town's symbols. The tower is a square two-story structure. On the first floor there is an open patio with a well, a chapel and a warehouse. On the upper floor, where the lords lived, there is a cornice with battlements and a path for guards. The castle is a good example of military gothic style.

See also 

 Route of the Valencian classics
 Castle of Barchell
 Route of the Castles of Vinalopó
 Castle of Banyeres

Bibliography 
Guía de Arquitectura de la Provincia de Alicante. 
PAREDES VAÑÓ, Enric (2011), "Aproximación a la arquitectura de las fortificaciones en las montañas del valle central del Serpis. Las Torres". Actas del Séptimo Congreso Nacional de Historia de la Construcción. Instituto Juan de Herrera - Madrid - 2011.  | 2 vols., 146 comunicaciones, 1507 pp.

External links 
Cocentaina Castle at Cocentaina Tourist Office  
Guide of the Clastle of Cocentaina 

Castles in the Valencian Community
Bien de Interés Cultural landmarks in the Province of Alicante